DXSN (1017 AM) Radyo Magbalantay is a radio station owned and operated by Silangan Broadcasting Corporation, the media arm of the Roman Catholic Diocese of Surigao. Its studio is located along Magallanes St., Surigao City. It is one of the pioneer stations of Northeastern Mindanao.

References

Radio stations in Surigao del Norte
Radio stations established in 1971
News and talk radio stations in the Philippines